Thaxterogaster talimultiformis is a species of mushroom producing fungus in the family Cortinariaceae. It was previously known as Cortinarius talimultiformis.

Taxonomy 
The species was described in 2014 and classified as Cortinarius talimultiformis. It was placed in the subgenus Phlegmacium of the large mushroom genus Cortinarius.

In 2022 the species was transferred from Cortinarius and reclassified as Thaxterogaster talimultiformis based on genomic data.

Etymology 
The specific epithet talimultiformis refers to the similar features it shares with species Thaxterogaster multiformis and Thaxterogaster talus.

Habitat and distribution 
Found in North and Central Europe, as well as the East Black Sea Region's mountains (Turkey), where it grows on the ground in hemiboreal to boreal, mesic coniferous forests containing spruce and fir.

See also

List of Cortinarius species

References

External links

talimultiformis
Fungi described in 2014
Fungi of Europe